Mahd-i Ulyā (meaning "Sublime Cradle" or the highest ranked cradle), also transliterated as Mahd-e Olyā, was a common title for empress mother, mothers of Shahs, or crown princes, in Iran during the Safavid and Qajar eras. It is also occasionally used in a similar context for the wife or the mother of a local ruler or a religious leader: 
 Malek Jahan Khanom, mother of Naser al-Din Shah Qajar
 Gawhar Shad, wife of Shah Rukh
 Khayr al-Nisa Begum, wife of Shah Muhammad Khodabanda and mother of Shah Abbas I
Fatimih, wife of Bahá'u'lláh
 Sultanum Begum ( – 1593), Queen consort of Iran

Society of Iran
Safavid imperial harem
Qajar harem